Sitona sulcifrons is a species of weevil native to Europe.

References

External links
Images representing Sitona at BOLD

Curculionidae
Beetles described in 1798
Beetles of Europe